The Irish Times National Debating Championship is a debating competition for students in higher education in Ireland. It has been run since 1960, sponsored by The Irish Times. While most participants represent institutions in the Republic of Ireland, institutions in Northern Ireland are also eligible.

History
The Union of Students in Ireland approached The Irish Times in 1960 to secure sponsorship for an Irish equivalent of the Observer Mace, a debating competition started in Britain in 1954.  The "Debating Union of Ireland" was formed for a time, but later The Irish Times would appoint a student convenor each year, often a previous year's winner. Until the 1970s, the best teams and individual went on to compete in the final of the Observer Mace. (The Mace no longer has an individual competition.)

In 1979, Gary Holbrook of Metropolitan State College of Denver was on sabbatical at Trinity College Dublin and was impressed with the debate. In 1980, he persuaded Coors Brewers to sponsor a debate tour of U.S. colleges for the winning team and individual speakers. The Irish were struck there by the very different approach of American debaters. Holbrook subsequently organised "Friends of the Irish Debate", sponsored by The Irish Times and Aer Lingus, to make the tour annual. The tour is now organised by the U.S. National Parliamentary Debate Association.

In 2010, a special celebration marked the debate's 50th anniversary.

Format
The competition is generally considered the most prestigious in Ireland, due in part to the additional media attention provided by its sponsor, but also the status of some of the former winners, and the US tour which forms part of the prize. Running between November and February, it operates on a knockout basis, with the initial entrants (usually between 150 and 170 teams) being whittled down over successive rounds, culminating in a Grand Final with four teams and four individuals competing for team honours (The Demosthenes Trophy) and an individual prize (The Christina Murphy Memorial Trophy).

The format of the competition is now unique in third-level debating, combining team and individual roles. The first round consists solely of team entrants, from which both teams and individuals progress, thus creating subsequent rounds featuring both. Individuals may be selected from a team at any stage of the competition, including to win the competition at the final stage. The winning individual cannot be selected from the winning team, though this restriction was not observed in the 1972 competition, where Donal Deeny took both prizes. In that year, the judges nominated Kathleen Boyle to progress to the Observer Mace individual competition.

The only other competition to adopt the same format is the All-Ireland Schools' Debating Competition.

Winners

By year

|-
!2023
|SADSI ||  Ailbhe Noonan || Gavin Dowd || MTU Debating Society  || Oliver McKenna
|}

By society

Notable participants
Many winners have gone on to have successful careers in law. Former winners in the legal field include Chief Justice of the Supreme Court of Ireland, Donal O'Donnell, Supreme Court judge, Adrian Hardiman, former Managing Partner and Chairman of Arthur Cox (law firm), Eugene McCague, High Court of Ireland judges David Holland (judge) and Cian Ferriter, Senior Counsels Paul Anthony McDermott, Rossa Fanning, John O'Donnell, Dermot Gleeson, Aidan Browne, and Gregory Murphy, King's Counsel at Doughty Street Chambers, Caoilfhionn Gallagher, professors Conor Gearty, Kieran Healy and Charles Lysaght, and Circuit Court judges Esmond Smyth, Kevin O'Higgins, and Brian Curtin. James Connolly, winner in 1974, was Vice Chairman of the Bar Council of Ireland and recently chair of public inquiries in Dublin.

David O'Sullivan, winner in 1974, became secretary general to the President of the European Commission.  Maeve Collins, winner in 1989, is the Irish Ambassador to Vietnam. Neville Keery, 1960 winner, was a member of the 12th Seanad, and later Head of Libraries of the European Commission.

Other well-known former winners include broadcasters Anthony Clare, Henry Kelly, Derek Davis, Cian Ó hÉigeartaigh, and Marian Finucane; comedian Dara Ó Briain; and writers Eamonn McCann, Gerry Stembridge, Kevin Cahill.
The losing finalists in 1966 included future Presidents Mary Robinson and Michael D. Higgins. Future Tánaiste Mary Harney and Minister Mary Hanafin also appeared as finalists.

References

External links
 Current Irish Times Debating Competition Website
 The Irish Times on Colm Flynn's website

1960 establishments in Ireland
Debating competitions in Ireland
Irish culture
Recurring events established in 1960
The Irish Times